The 1969-70 Four Hills Tournament was a German-Austrian skiing tournament in 1969 and 1970.

Participating nations and athletes

Results

Oberstdorf
 Schattenbergschanze, Oberstdorf
28 December 1969

Garmisch-Partenkirchen
 Große Olympiaschanze, Garmisch-Partenkirchen
1 January 1970

Innsbruck
 Bergiselschanze, Innsbruck
4 December 1970

Bischofshofen
 Paul-Ausserleitner-Schanze, Bischofshofen
6 January 1970

Final ranking

References

External links
 FIS website
 Four Hills Tournament web site

Four Hills Tournament
1969 in ski jumping
1970 in ski jumping